Corps is a commune in the department of Isère in southeastern France.

Its inhabitants are called the Corpatus.

Geography
Corps is a small town in the south of France. Located in the Beaumont region in the Southern Alps, on the borders on the frontier between the départments of Isère and Hautes-Alpes. It is located 40 km north of Gap, 65 km south of Grenoble and 220 km to the north of Marseille.

The village of Corps is surrounded by high mountains, including the Obiou in the Dévoluy massif which overlooks the magnificent Sautet lake.

The village is at the start of the road which leads to the Marian Sanctuary of La Salette, place of pilgrimage where Our Lady of La Salette would have appeared to two small shepherds from Corps, Mélanie Calvat and Maximin Giraud.

Population

Twin towns
Corps is twinned with:
  Plouëc-du-Trieux, France

See also
 Our Lady of La Salette
 Mélanie Calvat
 Maximin Giraud
 Route Napoléon
Communes of the Isère department

References

External links

 Municipality of Corps
 Tourism Office

Communes of Isère
Isère communes articles needing translation from French Wikipedia